Events of 2019 in Bhutan.

Incumbents
 King: Jigme Khesar Namgyel Wangchuck
 Prime Minister: Lotay Tshering

Events

Births

Deaths

References 

 
Bhutan
2019 in Asia
2010s in Bhutan
Years of the 21st century in Bhutan